Isaac Hor (賀傾文) is a Malaysian artist. His profession including film director, actor and host.

Acting

Production

Others

Achievement

References

Media reports

External links
Isaac Hor's Facebook page
Isaac Hor's Sina Weibo
Isaac Hor's YouTube Channel

1946 births
Living people
Malaysian film directors
Malaysian male actors